is a retired Japanese ski jumper.

References

Living people
Japanese male ski jumpers
Year of birth missing (living people)
Ski jumpers at the 1986 Asian Winter Games